Tropidia polystachya, the young palm orchid, is a species of orchid native to Mexico, Central America, Greater Antilles, Bahamas, Cayman Islands, Florida, Colombia, Venezuela, and Ecuador (including Galápagos).

References

External links 
IOSPE orchid photos

polystachya
Orchids of North America
Orchids of Central America
Orchids of South America
Orchids of Belize
Orchids of Colombia
Orchids of Costa Rica
Orchids of El Salvador
Orchids of Ecuador
Orchids of Florida
Orchids of Guatemala
Orchids of Honduras
Orchids of Mexico
Orchids of Panama
Orchids of Venezuela
Flora of the Caribbean
Flora of the Bahamas
Flora of the Cayman Islands
Plants described in 1788
Flora without expected TNC conservation status